KKHR (106.3 FM) is a Spanish contemporary radio station serving the Abilene, Texas, area.

History
On February 18, 1988, a construction permit was granted to SURE Broadcasting, owned by Susan Lundborg, for a new 3,000-watt radio station on 106.3 MHz in Abilene. 
A classic country format under the name "Kicks 106" and the call letters KHXS were selected, and the station rented space on the tower of KACU. The station began at 1:06 p.m. on October 6, 1989.

In 1991, KHXS switched to a Spanish-language format of Tejano music. The station's management and airstaff came from KKHR (98.1 FM), which simultaneously converted to oldies. This new format lasted less than 18 months; the same core group moved on August 1, 1992, to KEYJ (1560 AM) because the station was not making enough money for its owner. After nearly two months, businessman Dave Boyll became the new operator, adopting an easy listening format. Most of the songs the station played were from Boyll's own collection.

In November 1992, just as KHXS's easy listening format got underway, Sure Broadcasting declared bankruptcy, and its stations were transferred to a receiver. After nearly four years, the receiver found a buyer: Larry Hickerson, whose IQ Radio owned WPIQ in Brunswick, Georgia. The transaction forced Boyll to move his easy listening programming to daytime hours on KYYD (1340 AM), a sports radio station that Boyll had begun leasing in January 1995. Hickerson, for his part, already had a contract in hand to sell KHXS to another Abilene radio station owner.

After the easy listening programming moved out, Taylor County Broadcasting—a related company to the owners of KBCY and KCDD—began leasing the frequency from Hickerson and operated it with a conservative talk format, "The Talk of the Town at 106.3", with nationally syndicated hosts including Don Imus, Rush Limbaugh, and Laura Schlessinger. This lasted just seven months, and in August, it was replaced with classic rock as "The Bear". That November, Cumulus Media—which simultaneously purchased KBCY and KCDD—acquired KHXS by exercising a purchase option with Hickerson.

Cumulus also took over KFQX-FM 102.7 and switched the formats of the two stations in 1998, with 106.3 inheriting the contemporary hits "Fox FM" that had been revived on the 102.7 frequency the year prior. It then traded with Powell Meredith Communications Company, which owned KKHR at 98.1; a format and call sign swap resulted, bringing the Spanish-language music programming of KKHR to the 106.3 frequency. Powell Meredith not only brought over KKHR's music to the frequency, it also brought a running dispute with the American Society of Composers, Authors and Publishers. Since 1995, the station had not paid for an ASCAP license, and it played ASCAP-registered songs under a de facto license that expired at the end of 2000. From 2001 to 2003, ASCAP contacted Powell Meredith five times and advised them not to play its songs without a license; the owners of the station rebuffed proposals to settle the dispute. In October 2002 and again in July 2003, ASCAP sent an agent to Abilene to record the station's broadcasts. An ASCAP-employed musician confirmed that the station had aired eight compositions represented by the performing rights society without permission, such as Santana's version of "Oye Como Va" and Juan Gabriel's "Se Me Olvidó Otra Vez" (I Forgot Again). In 2005, a court awarded $8,000 in statutory damages to ASCAP and the rightsholders of the compositions.

Canfin Enterprises, a company owned by Parker Cannan, purchased KKHR in late 2004 for $684,000. In 2022, Canfin Enterprises reached a deal to sell its Abilene radio cluster to WesTex Telco, LLC, owner of KTJK (101.7 FM). On November 7, 2022, KKHR began stunting, promising "something new" and a "Great Flip" for a new format to debut on November 10; on that date, KKHR relaunched as "My 106.3", continuing to air Spanish-language hit music in a bilingual presentation.

References

External links

KHR
Radio stations established in 1989
1989 establishments in Texas